Patio is the debut album by Gorky's Zygotic Mynci. It was originally released on 10" vinyl only in June 1992 on the Ankst label, and re-issued on CD in June 1995 with nine extra tracks. It is made up of a mixture of live, studio, and home recordings.

John Cale once named it his favourite ever album.

Track listing
All songs written by Lawrence/Childs unless otherwise stated. Tracks 13-21 appear on the 1995 CD re-release only.

"Peanut Dispenser"
"Lladd Eich Gwraig"
"Dafad yn Siarad"
"Mr Groovy"
"Ti! Moses" (Lawrence/James/Childs)
"Barbed Wire"
"Miriam o Farbel"
"Oren, Mefus a Chadno"
"Gwallt Rhegi Pegi" (Childs)
"Sally Webster" (Childs)
"Diamonds o Monte Carlo"
"Siwt Nofio" (Childs)
"Blessed Are the Meek"
"Reverend Oscar Marzaroli"
"Oren, Mefus a Chadno" (alternative version)
"Dean Ser" (Childs)
"Siwmper Heb Grys"
"Llenni ar Gloi" (Childs)
"Anna Apera" (Childs)
"Siwt Nofio" (alternative version) (Childs)
"Hi ar Gân" (Lawrence/James/Childs)

References

1992 albums
Gorky's Zygotic Mynci albums
Welsh-language albums